In mathematics, Jean-Pierre Serre conjectured the following statement regarding the Galois cohomology of a simply connected semisimple algebraic group.  Namely, he conjectured that if G is such a group over a perfect field F of cohomological dimension at most 2, then the Galois cohomology set H1(F, G) is zero.

A converse of the conjecture holds: if the field F is perfect and if the cohomology set H1(F, G) is zero for every semisimple simply connected algebraic group G then the p-cohomological dimension of F is at most 2 for every prime p.

The conjecture holds in the case where F is a local field (such as p-adic field) or a global field with no real embeddings (such as Q()).  This is a special case of the Kneser–Harder–Chernousov Hasse principle for algebraic groups over global fields.  (Note that such fields do indeed have cohomological dimension at most 2.)
The conjecture also holds when F is finitely generated over the complex numbers and has transcendence degree at most 2.

The conjecture is also known to hold for certain groups G.  For special linear groups, it is a consequence of the Merkurjev–Suslin theorem.  Building on this result, the conjecture holds if G is a classical group. The conjecture also holds if G is one of certain kinds of exceptional group.

References

External links
 Philippe Gille's survey of the conjecture

Field (mathematics)
Algebraic number theory
Unsolved problems in number theory